Melody Thornton (born September 28, 1984) is an American singer and television personality. After graduating high school, Thornton became one the main vocalists of the pop girl group the Pussycat Dolls and released the albums PCD (2005) and Doll Domination (2008) becoming one of the world's best-selling girl groups. As part of the group, she has received a Grammy Award nomination.

Following her departure from the group in 2010, Thornton independently released a mixtape, P.O.Y.B.L (2012), and an EP, Lioness Eyes (2020). Outside her music, she has competed on reality shows, Popstar to Operastar (2011), Dancing on Ice (2019) and won the fourth season of the Australian version of The Masked Singer (2022). She has also done several stage works, including playing Rachel Marron in the musical The Bodyguard.

Early life 

Melody Thornton is a native of Phoenix, Arizona and was born on September 28, 1984, to a family of Mexican and African-American descent. She was educated in Camelback High School. Her first performance was at her school, where she sang "This Little Light of Mine" at the age of six, and continued to perform at local talent shows in Arizona. After high school, she enrolled in college with the intention to major in music engineering, but dropped after one semester to join the Pussycat Dolls.

Career

2003–2010: The Pussycat Dolls 

At the age of 19, Thornton traveled to Burbank, California to audition for the Pussycat Dolls. The group's founder Robin Antin, struck a deal with Interscope Geffen A&M Records' Jimmy Iovine to develop the Pussycat Dolls into a brand and create a separate recording pop group. Thornton was selected to strengthen their vocal ability and joined Carmit Bachar, Ashley Roberts, Nicole Scherzinger, Jessica Sutta, and Kimberly Wyatt, and signed a contract with the Pussycat Dolls partnership, receiving a percentage of the group's revenues. Thornton along with Bachar supplied vocals as secondary vocalists, while Scherzinger assumed the majority of the vocals as the lead singer. Thornton was the youngest and the only member who did not have a background in dance. The group released their first single, "Don't Cha" (featuring Busta Rhymes), which stands as group's most successful single to date peaked number two on the Billboard Hot 100 chart and reached the top in other 15 countries. Thornton didn't like the song in the beginning, as she found too controversial. They released their self-titled debut album in September 2005. Subsequent singles, "Stickwitu and "Buttons" also reached the top five on the Billboard Hot 100 chart. PCD went on to sell seven million copies worldwide and established the Pussycat Dolls as viable in the music industry earning them a reputation among the century's few breakout successes.

Thornton was featured on Jibbs' single "Go Too Far", which was released on March 2007; it entered the top-twenty on the New Zealand Singles Chart. Their second and final studio album Doll Domination was released in September 2008, the album attained its highest peak position on the US Billboard 200, but it is considered a commercial disappointment selling less than 400,000 copies in the US. Doll Domination included the singles "When I Grow Up" and "I Hate This Part", which reached the top twenty on the US Billboard Hot 100 chart. In January 2009, the group embarked on the Doll Domination Tour, their second headlining concert tour, which highlighted stops in Europe, Oceania and Asia, and grossed over $14 million. Following the release of the group's single 2009 "Jai Ho! (You Are My Destiny)", tensions in the group rose due to Scherzinger being billed as a featured artist on the release. This would go on to lead to a public outburst by Thornton during the group's tour appearance while opening for The Circus Starring Britney Spears.

The group would then announce a hiatus; Thornton then cameoed on Keri Hilson's music video "Slow Dance" and appeared as a panelist on E!'s Bank of Hollywood in which contestants must appeal to a celebrity panel to receive money. It lasted for one season. In June 2010, Thornton confirmed she had departed the Pussycat Dolls and was working on a solo album.

2011–2017: P.O.Y.B.L and other projects

Since her departure from the Pussycat Dolls, Thornton has remained an independent artist. On February 20, 2010, in an interview for The Source Thornton explained that her songs will be different from the group's sound but will not going to abandon that pop demographic that she acquired through the Pussycat Dolls.
In June 2010 Rap-Up first announced that Thornton was working on her solo album with collaborators including Cee Lo Green, Polow da Don, and Lil Wayne. On Vibe Magazine she stated that she is also working with Dre and Vidal. Thornton's recording of the Cee Lo produced song "Love Gun" leaked to the internet around this time. The song was eventually recorded by Green and Lauren Bennett for his album The Lady Killer.

On June 16, 2011, Thornton's first official single, "Sweet Vendetta", was released. On June 26, 2011, Thornton announced plans to have her debut solo album released sometime in 2012. On March 5, 2012, Lipstick & Guilt was released as a promotional single. On March 15, 2012, her first mixtape P.O.Y.B.L, an acronym for Piss on Your Black List, was released. The mixtape contains 10 tracks of five remakes and four originals all written by Melody. The project includes production from Andre Harris ("Smoking Gun"), Church and State ("Sweet Vendetta"), Mark Vinten ("Intro"), and Melody on the self-produced "Hit the Ground Runnin'," plus a duet with Bobby Newberry (a cover of La Roux's "Bulletproof").

On May 24, 2012, a music video for the cover version of "Bulletproof" from P.O.Y.B.L, featuring Bobby Newberry, premiered. On June 14, 2012, she made a cameo appearance in a Bobby Newberry's music video for his debut single Dirrty Up, alongside ex-Pussycat Doll member Ashley Roberts.

On April 30, 2013, Thornton was a featured vocalist on LL Cool J's 2013 album Authentic on the track "Something About You (Love The World)" along with Charlie Wilson and Earth, Wind & Fire.

On May 17, 2013, Thornton made a special guest appearance in Fat Joe's music video "Ballin'".

2017–present: Television appearances, stage work, and Lioness Eyes 

In 2017, Thornton returned to British television by appearing on the second series of Celebs Go Dating and Celebrity Island with Bear Grylls. She then landed the lead role of Rachel Marron in the musical The Bodyguard, which toured in China for several months. In 2019, Thornton was eliminated on the eight week and placed fifth on the eleventh series of Dancing on Ice. This was followed with stage roles on Rip It Up – The 70s, a show inspired by music of the 70s and played the part of Cinderella in the New Wimbledon Theatre production of the family pantomime, Cinderella.

Thornton opted out to join the November 2019 reunion of the Pussycat Dolls in order to focus on her solo endeavors. She collaborated with UK DJ producer Harrison on the dance track "Freak Like Me" and released her first solo track in seven years, "Love Will Return". A ballad that is a nod to her heritage and serves as the lead single for her debut EP, Lioness Eyes. The EP, which includes seven songs was released on August 7.

In 2022, Thornton competed and won the fourth season of the Australian version of The Masked Singer as "Mirrorball". She will reprise the role of Rachel Marron in the 2023 UK and Ireland production of the musical The Bodyguard.

Artistry and musical style 

Thornton was inspired to sing after her father's favorite artists, BB King, Aretha Franklin, and The Jacksons. In another interview, she named Mariah Carey as a vocal inspiration. Her vocals were likened to Christina Aguilera's.

Discography

Extended plays

Mixtapes

Singles

Featured singles

Album appearances 

Notes

Music videos

Filmography

Film

Television

Stage credits

Awards and nominations

Footnotes

References

External links

1984 births
American musicians of Mexican descent
American sopranos
African-American female dancers
African-American dancers
African-American women singers
American dance musicians
American female dancers
American dancers
American women pop singers
American contemporary R&B singers
Musicians from Phoenix, Arizona
The Pussycat Dolls members
Living people
21st-century American women singers
21st-century American singers
Hispanic and Latino American women singers